L&D may refer to:

 Learning and development, in human resource management and training
 Labor and delivery

See also 
 L/D (disambiguation)